José Luis "Coto" Sierra Pando (born 5 December 1968) is a Chilean football coach and former player. He is the manager of Al-Wehda.

Playing in the midfield, he retired in 2009, and one year later he became the coach of his long-time team Unión Española. He studied in the Colegio Hispano Americano, which belongs to Spanish residents in Chile. In 2015, he became the new coach of Colo-Colo.

Club career

Unión Española
Sierra made his debut in professional soccer with Unión Española on November 1988 against the Universidad de Chile. After two solid campaigns with Unión Española, Sierra was transferred to Real Valladolid in Spain. However, during Sierra's short time in Spain, the team had economic problems which caused him to return to Unión Española. After more success he made his debut with the Chile national team. Sierra won the Copa Chile with Unión Española in 1992 and 1993.

Colo-Colo
After an unsuccessful stint in Brazil playing for São Paulo, he went on to spend three successful years with Colo-Colo, which saw his team capture the championship in all three seasons.  Currently Sierra has found his way back to Unión Española, making a stop in between to play with UANL Tigres in Mexico for one season.  He captured the Golden Boot in Chile (awarded to the best professional football player in Chile) in 2004 and 2005.

In 1997, it was widely rumoured that then Premier League side Everton manager Howard Kendall had made an approach to bring Sierra to Goodison Park. However, for unknown reasons, possibly relating to lack of sufficient capital, Kendall decided to pull the plug on the deal.

Return to Unión Española
Sierra announced his retirement in December 2008 and accepted the position of manager with his beloved Unión Española.  He will continue on the position until the end of the Clausura 2009 tournament.

International career
Sierra was capped 53 times and scored eight goals for the Chile national team between 1991 and 2000. He played four games at the 1998 FIFA World Cup, scoring a goal on a free-kick against Cameroon.

International goals
Scores and results list Chile's goal tally first.

Coaching career
Sierra started coaching in 2010 of Chilean club Unión Española and spent five years there. He won the 2013 Torneo Transición with them. Unión won the Apertura Tournament of 2013, after defeating Colo-Colo 1–0 in the final match. In 2015, he became the coach of Colo-Colo. In only one season, he won the 2015 Torneo Apertura title with and also led them into the 2015 Copa Chile. On July 22, 2016, he signed a one-year contract with eight-time Saudi champions Al-Ittihad with an option to sign for another season.

On 7 November 2021, Sierra was appointed as the manager of Saudi Arabian club Al-Tai.

On 20 October 2022, Sierra was appointed as manager of Al-Wehda.

Managerial statistics

Honours

Player
He played in Chile on the national soccer team for nine years, from 1991 to 2000.

Club
Colo-Colo
 Primera División de Chile (3): 1996, 1997–C 1998
 Copa Chile (1): 1996

Unión Española
 Copa Chile (3): 1989, 1992, 1993
 Primera División de Chile (1): 2005–A

Individual
 Chilean Footballer of the Year: 2005

Manager

Club
Unión Española
 Primera División de Chile (1): 2013 Transición

Colo-Colo
 Primera División de Chile (1): 2015 Apertura
 Copa Chile: Runner-up 2015

Ittihad FC
Saudi Crown Prince Cup 2017
King Cup: 2018

Individual
 Saudi Professional League Manager of the Month: April 2019

References

External links
 

1968 births
Living people
Footballers from Santiago
Association football midfielders
Chilean people of Asturian descent
Chilean people of Spanish descent
Chilean footballers
Chilean expatriate footballers
Chile international footballers
Unión Española footballers
Real Valladolid players
São Paulo FC players
Colo-Colo footballers
Tigres UANL footballers
Chilean Primera División players
La Liga players
Campeonato Brasileiro Série A players
Liga MX players
1998 FIFA World Cup players
1993 Copa América players
1995 Copa América players
1999 Copa América players
Expatriate footballers in Spain
Chilean expatriate sportspeople in Spain
Expatriate footballers in Brazil
Chilean expatriate sportspeople in Brazil
Expatriate footballers in Mexico
Chilean expatriate sportspeople in Mexico
Chilean football managers
Unión Española managers
Colo-Colo managers
Ittihad FC managers
Al Ahli Club (Dubai) managers
Club Deportivo Palestino managers
Al-Ta'ee managers
Al-Wehda Club (Mecca) managers
Chilean Primera División managers
Saudi Professional League managers
UAE Pro League managers
Chilean expatriate football managers
Expatriate football managers in Saudi Arabia
Chilean expatriate sportspeople in Saudi Arabia
Expatriate football managers in the United Arab Emirates
Chilean expatriate sportspeople in the United Arab Emirates